Information architecture (IA) is the structural design of shared information environments; the art and science of organizing and labelling websites, intranets, online communities and software to support usability and findability; and an emerging community of practice focused on bringing principles of design, architecture and information science to the digital landscape.  Typically, it involves a model or concept of information that is used and applied to activities which require explicit details of complex information systems. These activities include library systems and database development.

Information management lies between data management and knowledge management. Data management focuses on handling individual pieces of data for example by using databases. Knowledge management focuses on information that exists within a humans mind, and how to extract and share this. Information Architecture is distinct from process management but there are often valuable interactions between information and process and practitioners have developed tools such as information/process matrices.

Definition
Information architecture has somewhat different meanings in different branches of information systems or information technology:
 The structural design of shared information environments.
 The art and science of organizing and labeling web sites, intranets, online communities, and software to support findability and usability.
 An emerging community of practice focused on bringing principles of design and architecture to the digital landscape.
 The combination of organization, labeling, search and navigation systems within websites and intranets.
 Extracting required parameters/data of Engineering Designs in the process of creating a knowledge-base linking different systems and standards.
 A blueprint and navigational aid to the content of information-rich systems.
 A subset of data architecture where usable data (a.k.a. information) is constructed in and designed or arranged in a fashion most useful or empirically holistic to the users of this data.
 The practice of organizing the information / content / functionality of a web site so that it presents the best user experience it can, with information and services being easily usable and findable (as applied to web design and development).
 The conceptual framework surrounding information, providing context, awareness of location and sustainable structure.

Debate 
The difficulty in establishing a common definition for "information architecture" arises partly from the term's existence in multiple fields.  In the field of systems design, for example, information architecture is a component of enterprise architecture that deals with the information component when describing the structure of an enterprise.

While the definition of information architecture is relatively well-established in the field of systems design, it is much more debatable within the context of online information(i.e., websites). Andrew Dillon refers to the latter as the "big IA–little IA debate". In the little IA view, information architecture is essentially the application of information science to web design which considers, for example, issues of classification and information retrieval. In the big IA view, information architecture involves more than just the organization of a website; it also factors in user experience, thereby considering usability issues of information design.

Notable people in information architecture

Richard Saul Wurman, credited with coining the term information architecture in relation to the design of information
Peter Morville, president of Semantic Studios and co-author of Information Architecture for the World Wide Web (1998, 2002, 2006, 2015)
Louis Rosenfeld, founder of Rosenfeld Media and co-author of Information Architecture for the World Wide Web (1998, 2002, 2006, 2015)
Jesse James Garrett
Christina Wodtke

See also 

 Applications architecture
 Card sorting
 Chief experience officer
 Content management
 Content strategy
 Controlled vocabulary
 Data management
 Data presentation architecture
 Digital humanities
 Ecological interface design
 Enterprise information security architecture
 Faceted classification
 Human factors and ergonomics
 Informatics
 Interaction design
 Process architecture
 Site map
 Social information architecture
 Tree testing
 User experience design
 
 Wayfinding
 Web graph
 Web literacy (Infrastructure)

References

Bibliography

Further reading 
 
 
 
 

 
Enterprise architecture

Information governance
Information science
Records management
Technical communication